Austin Bayou is a small waterway in Brazoria County, in the U.S. state of Texas. The bayou is named for Stephen F. Austin, the founder of Texas.

See also
List of rivers of Texas

References

USGS Geographic Names Information Service
USGS Hydrologic Unit Map - State of Texas (1974)

Rivers of Texas